The 1970 Louisiana Tech Bulldogs football team was an American football team that represented Louisiana Tech University as a member of the Gulf States Conference during the 1970 NCAA College Division football season. In their fourth year under head coach Maxie Lambright, the team compiled an 2–8 record.

Schedule

References

Louisiana Tech
Louisiana Tech Bulldogs football seasons
Louisiana Tech Bulldogs football